Social Movement Studies is a bimonthly peer-reviewed academic journal covering social science research on protests, social movements, and collective behavior, including reviews of books on these topics. It was established in 2002 as a biannual journal by founding co-editors Tim Jordan, Adam Lent, and George McKay, soon to be joined by Anne Mische, and is published by Routledge. The current editor-in-chief is Cristina Flesher Fominaya (Aarhus University) . Previous editors-in-chief include and Kevin Gillan (University of Manchester), Graeme Hayes (Aston University) and Brian Doherty (Keele University).

Abstracting and indexing
The journal is abstracted and indexed in Current Contents/Social & Behavioral Sciences, Social Sciences Citation Index, and Scopus.  According to the Journal Citation Reports, the journal has a 2018 impact factor of 2.0.

References

External links

Publications established in 2002
Sociology journals
Bimonthly journals
Works about social movements
Routledge academic journals
English-language journals